Liuhe ((Liuho) lit. "Liu Creek") is a town under the jurisdiction of Taicang county-level city in Suzhou, China.

Name
Liuhe town was called Liujiagang (lit. "Liu Family Harbor"). It is sometimes also encountered as Liuhegang (lit. "Liuhe Harbor").

Geography

It borders Fuqiao town. Owing to this placement, Liuhe is sometimes known in Chinese as the "First Town at the End of the River and the Start of the Sea".

Famous people

Famous people linked to Liuhe include:
 Chien-Shiung Wu was a Chinese physicist who lived in the United States and was born and raised in Liuhe. She is regarded as the "queen of physics" for her work on beta decay and laying the groundwork for the creation of the Standard Model in particle physics.
 Steven Chu is a Nobel Prize winner in physics, whose ancestral hometown is Liuhe.

Industries
Fishing is the traditional industry in Liuhe and it is still one of the most important industries in Liuhe. Liuhe also has quite developed manufacturing. There are a few regionally famous manufacturing companies in Liuhe.

Transportation
China National Highway 328 runs through Liuhe.

References

External links
Government of Liuhe portal

Township-level divisions of Suzhou
Taicang